Tilaksha Sumanasiri (born 20 January 1995) is a Sri Lankan cricketer who plays for Ragama Cricket Club. He made his first-class debut for Ragama Cricket Club in the 2015–16 Premier League Tournament on 18 December 2015.

References

External links
 

1995 births
Living people
Sri Lankan cricketers
Ragama Cricket Club cricketers
Cricketers from Colombo
Galle Guardians cricketers